The 1899 Minnesota Golden Gophers football team represented the University of Minnesota in the 1899 college football season. The Golden Gophers compiled a 6–3–2 record (0–3 against Western Conference opponents) and outscored all opponents by a combined total of 149 to 79.
 
Jack Harrison and William C. Leary and were head coaches for the 1899 season. They coached the team as a part of a new alumni coaching program. Although most around the program considered the experiment a success, the program was discontinued with the hiring of the University's first full-time salaried coach, Henry L. Williams. The 1899 season was the only season under head coaches Leary and Harrison. This season's 0–3 record left Minnesota in a last place tie with Illinois.

Northrop Field was first used as the home field of the University of Minnesota this year with most of the credit for securing it going to former coach Frederick S. Jones and former Governor John S. Pillsbury.

Schedule

Roster
 Ends, Dobie (left end), Henry "Buzz" Scandrett (captain and right end) and Fosseen (right end)
 Tackles, Otte, Gray (left tackle), Hoyt, Mueller (right tackle)
 Guards, Aune (left guard), Tifft, Flynn (right guard)
 Center, Page
 Quarterback, Cole, Rogers
 Halfbacks, Evans, Bernhagen (left half), Kienholtz, Freeman (right half) 
 Fullback, Glover.

References

Minnesota
Minnesota Golden Gophers football seasons
Minnesota Golden Gophers football